The  is a railway line operated by West Japan Railway Company (JR West) within the city of Hiroshima in Japan. It connects Hiroshima Station and Aki-Kameyama Station in Asakita-ku. The actual junction station is Yokogawa. It is one of the commuter lines to Hiroshima.

Route data
Operator: West Japan Railway Company (Class-1 railroad)
Official line length: 
Gauge: 
Double track: none (entirely single track)
Electrified sections: entire line (1500 VDC)
Safeworking system:
special automatic occlusive (track circuit detection type)

History

Private railway
The section now in operation of the Kabe Line was originally constructed by a private company and later purchased by Japanese Government Railways.

The section was opened by Dainippon Kidō in four phases.
 19 December 1909: Yokogawa Station to Gion Station
 19 November 1910: Gion Station to Furuichibashi Station
 25 December 1910: Furuichibashi Station to Ōtagawabashi Station
 12 June 1911: Ōtagwabashi Station to Kabe Station

The line was handed over to Kabe Kidō on 11 March 1919.
Kabe Kidō was merged to Hiroshima Denki Kidō on 1 May 1926.

The line was originally built to  gauge and not electrified. The line was electrified and re-gauged (to the national standard of ) in the following steps.

 9 November 1928: Yokogawa – Furuichibashi section. Bus service temporary replaces rest of the line. Matsubara Station closes and Taishi Station opens.
 10 August 1929: Furuichibashi –  section.
 2 December 1929: Ōtagawabashi – Kabe section.

The line was handed over to the Kōhin Railway on 1 July 1931.
On 1 December 1935, the line's legal status was changed from light railway to railway.

After nationalization
The line was nationalized on 1 September 1936, and became a part of Japanese Government Railways as the Kabe Line. Simultaneously, some station names were changed as follows:
 Oshibakoenguchi Station to Mitaki Station
 Nagatsuka Station to Aki-Nagatsuka Station
 Ōtagawabashi Station to Kami-Yagi Station
 Nakashima Station to Aki-Nakashima Station
 Kōhin-Kabe Station to Kabe Station

The line voltage was raised from 750 V to 1,500 V (JNR standard) on 23 April 1962.

Since 4 September 1968, the line had been on the government's list of deficit-ridden railways where service was to be discontinued.

After JR West took over the line in 1987, wanman driver-only operation was introduced on the Kabe – Sandankyō section.

Beginning in summer 2007, the ICOCA card can be used in all stations in the Hiroshima City Network, including all stations on the Kabe Line.

On 4 February 2011, it was announced that a  section of the abandoned segment, between Kabe Station and the former Kōdo Station, would be electrified and reopened. This will be the first such reopening by a JR Group company since the privatization of Japanese National Railways (JNR).

Discontinued/suspended section

JGR extended the line beyond Kabe Station. The extended sections were not electrified.
 13 October 1936: Extension to Aki-Imuro Station completed
 30 March 1954: Extension to Kake Station completed (on completion of this extension, the total length of Japanese National Railways exceeded .)
 27 July 1969: Extension to Sandankyō Station,  from Yokogawa, completed

The line was intended to be extended to Hamada station on the Sanin Main Line, and construction on that section commenced in 1974, before being abandoned in 1980.

The Kabe – Sandankyō section was closed on 1 December 2003.

Operator: West Japan Railway Company (Class-1 railroad)
Official line length: 
Gauge: 
Double track: none (entirely single track)
Electrified sections: non
Closure system:
section between Kabe Station and Kake Station: Special automatic closure type
section between Kake Station and Sandankyō Station: Staff closure type

Stations
Trains can pass at stations marked "||", "◇", "∨", and "∧". Trains cannot pass at stations marked "|".

Rolling stock
New 2- and 3-car 227 series electric trains were introduced on the Kabe Line from around 2015, replacing older 115 series trains. By 2019, all Kabe Line services were operated by 227 series trains.

References

 
Railway lines opened in 1909
1067 mm gauge railways in Japan
2 ft 6 in gauge railways in Japan